Mineyama Domain may refer to: 

 Mineyama Domain (Tango) 峯山藩, in Tango Province
 Mineyama Domain (Echigo) 三根山藩, in Echigo Province